Paul Tesanovich (born January 29, 1952) was a Democratic member of the Michigan House of Representatives, serving the western end of the Upper Peninsula from 1995 through 2000. He also served three separate times on the Baraga County Board of Commissioners and a period as chairman of the board.

A former U.P. staffer for then-Speaker Curtis Hertel, Tesanovich was elected to the House in a special election on April 6, 1994 (to replace Stephen Shepich who left office following the House Fiscal Agency scandal), defeating former incumbent Republican Stephen Dresch.

References

1952 births
Living people
People from Baraga County, Michigan
Gogebic Community College alumni
Michigan Technological University alumni
County commissioners in Michigan
Democratic Party members of the Michigan House of Representatives
20th-century American politicians
21st-century American politicians